Oo (27 April 1910 – 11 July 1995), known as Naga Daw Oo, was a 20th-century Burmese business tycoon from Mandalay, Myanmar. She is best remembered for her decades-long involvement with the annual Thingyan festivities in Mandalay as well as her contributions to Buddhist causes across the country.  She was the first person to receive the title of Agga Maha Thiri Thudhamma Theingi (Pali: Aggamahāsīrisudhammasiṅgī), the highest possible religious title for lay Buddhists in Myanmar.

Early life
Born to U Htin and Daw Su on 27 April 1910 in Mandalay, Oo was the eldest of 12 siblings. She was an elder sister of Ludu Daw Amar, a dissident writer and journalist. Oo was educated at the American Baptist Missionary School before leaving the school in 1927.

Business career
In 1929, Oo married Htun Chun of Myinmu. After her husband died during World War II, she assumed leadership of the company. In the 1960s, the Naga Cheroot was nationalized by the Union Revolutionary Council, leading to its eventual fallure.

Thingyan festival
For about 40 years, Oo ran the "Yay Nan Thuza" (or "Naga Me") mandat (pavilion) during the annual Thingyan festival in Mandalay. She personally managed a yein troupe and a water-throwing team, comprising shop owners and staff from the Zegyo Market.

Later life

Donations
Oo made many meritorious deeds, one of them was Naga Monastery in Mandalay. She was awarded the Sāsanānuggaha title (Sāsanānuggaha loosely translates as support of religious affairs) of Aggamahāsīrisudhammasiṅgī by the government for her contributions to Buddhist causes in Myanmar.

Death
Oo died in Mandalay on 11 July 1995 at the age of 85.

References

See also
 Burmese Buddhist titles
 Upāsaka and Upāsikā

1910 births
1995 deaths
Burmese Buddhists
20th-century Burmese businesspeople